Alfies Antique Market is a large indoor market located on Church Street in Lisson Grove, London. It houses over seventy-five dealers offering antiques; including silver, furniture, jewellery, paintings, ceramics, glass and vintage clothing.

Notable customers have included the designers Tom Dixon, Nina Campbell, Jasper Conran and Kelly Hoppen as well as celebrity visitors Michael Jackson, Julia Roberts, Rod Stewart, Kate Moss, Stella McCartney and many more.

History
Alfies was opened by Bennie Gray in 1976, housed in the Edwardian buildings of the former Jordans department store. Renovations have included an extension in 1988. The Quad opened in 2005, focussing on modern design from the last hundred years.

References

External links
Alfies website

Buildings and structures in the City of Westminster
Art Deco architecture in London
Tourist attractions in the City of Westminster
Retail markets in London
Department store buildings in the United Kingdom
Shops in London
1976 establishments in England